Hamilton County Fair is the name of a county fair in several counties named Hamilton in the United States:

 Hamilton County Fair (Illinois)
 Hamilton County Fair (Indiana)
 Hamilton County Fair (Iowa)
 Hamilton County Fair (Kansas)
 Hamilton County Fair (Nebraska)
 Hamilton County Fair (Ohio)
 Hamilton County Fair (Tennessee)